François Landriault-Barbeau (born July 5, 1985), known professionally as François Arnaud, is a Canadian film and television actor. He is best known for his roles as Cesare Borgia on Showtime's period drama series The Borgias, Manfred Bernardo on NBC's Midnight, Texas, and Tommy Castelli on Lifetime's UnReal.

Early life
Arnaud was born and raised in Montreal, Quebec. The first play he saw was 'Curano' at age nine. He was so inspired that he went home and tried to learn the monologues. He auditioned for drama school with a play called 'The Bull' written by a Canadian. In 2007, Arnaud trained at the Conservatoire d'art dramatique in Montreal.

Career
Arnaud started his career in his home country by landing a role in a comedy series called Taxi 0-22 and guest starring in several other Canadian shows. He also starred as Antonin Rimbaud in the French-Canadian film I Killed My Mother, directed by Xavier Dolan. Arnaud received a VFCC Award for Best Supporting Actor in a Canadian Film for the role, and credits this with getting an agent in Hollywood which helped him audition for bigger parts.

Arnaud became known for his performance as Cesare Borgia in the Showtime series The Borgias which filmed in Hungary.

He portrayed Oscar in the NBC drama series Blindspot. He also starred in Midnight, Texas portraying the role of a troubled psychic, Manfred Bernardo from 2017 to 2018. The show filmed in Albuquerque and Arnaud enjoyed exploring the mountains and waterfalls near by during his five months there.

In 2016, Arnaud filmed Permission in New York City. Later, Arnaud filmed sci-fi thriller Origami, a French-Canadian movie that was shot in his home town of Montreal. The movie was so physically and psychologically exhausting for Arnaud that he couldn't work for a month so took respite in a cabin in the woods.

In 2017, Arnaud filmed indie film, She's in Portland with Tommy Dewey that was released in 2020.

Arnaud featured in an episode of Emmy and Golden Globe Award winning show, Schitt's Creek as Sebastien Raine, David's ex-boyfriend and photographer.

In 2019, the movie Rapid Eye Movement was released which saw Arnaud playing a radio DJ whose ratings are falling so he plays a stunt by going without sleep to break a world record. Arnaud shot this in Times Square in a glass booth where he interacted with passersby. Also in 2019, Arnaud started shooting a psychological thriller called 'Home' about a young couple dealing with raising a newborn. He plays opposite Emily Hampshire, whom he met while working on Schitt's Creek, and cast because Emily would only accept her role if Arnaud would be allowed to play her husband.

Arnaud portrayed Dan Moody in The Moodys over two seasons until its cancellation in 2021.

Personal life
On 20 September 2020, Arnaud came out as bisexual on his Instagram. Arnaud has previously dated Holliday Grainger, Evelyne Brochu and Sarah Gadon.

Arnaud confesses to being a skeptical atheist who does not believe in the supernatural, but states that he still does not want it to get close to him. He regularly experiences sleep paralysis. He has a tattoo of a house on his back which is based on a drawing by Egon Schiele from 1912 called House with Bell Tower.

Arnaud enjoys reading Sally Rooney novels such as Normal People and Conversations with Friends because they have the best ending sentences.

E.T. is a childhood favourite of Arnaud's and he estimates he has seen it over four hundred times.

Arnaud can speak English, French and learnt Spanish in high school. He travelled to Latin America and had a Chilean girlfriend that helped him get a good handle of the Spanish language, he didn't use the language for a decade before working on The Borgias which required it.

Filmography

References

External links

 

1985 births
21st-century Canadian male actors
Bisexual male actors
Canadian atheists
Canadian emigrants to the United States
Canadian male film actors
Canadian male stage actors
Canadian male television actors
Conservatoire de musique du Québec à Montréal alumni
French Quebecers
Canadian LGBT actors
Living people
Male actors from Montreal
21st-century Canadian LGBT people